The Karate event at the 2022 Mediterranean Games was held in Oran, Algeria, from 26 to 27 June 2022.

Medal table

Medalists

Men

Women

References

External links
Official site
Results book

Sports at the 2022 Mediterranean Games
2022
Mediterranean Games